Lemon sticks are a type of stick candy. They are similar to candy canes and peppermint sticks except lemon oil and acids are used for the flavoring. And for the coloring a clear batch is used for the body and a white batch for the stripe. They are not the same as a lemon peppermint stick, otherwise known as a Baltimore lemon stick.

Since 1942, Giambri's is one of the candy makers that produces them.

Baltimore lemon stick 

In Baltimore, Maryland, part of the culture of Baltimore is a summer rite of passage associated with the Baltimore Flower Mart where lemon sticks (also referred to as lemon peppermint sticks) are a treat in the form of a peppermint candy stick stuck in a lemon. Eaten together they provide a sweet and sour taste sensation. The tradition may have come from France. They are sold at the mid-spring Flower Mart held by the Women's Civic League. These simple 'drinks' are made by cutting the top off a small lemon, cutting a hole into the flesh, and placing a soft peppermint stick into it. Sucking on the stick and squeezing the lemon produces a sweet, minty, lemony drink. While mostly sold at Flower Mart, throughout summer, people in Baltimore will make these treats at home or social gatherings.

See also
Candy stick
 Polkagris

References

Candy
Lemon dishes
Cuisine of Baltimore